Andreas "Ante" Eriksson (born 3 November 1981) is a retired Swedish football player who played as an offensive midfielder or as a forward. 

Eriksson grew up in Sundbyberg, Sweden with IFK Viksjö as his home team. He has also played for FC Väsby United, AIK Fotboll and IK Sirius. He scored his first goal for AIK in the premiere against Sundsvall. In 2007, Eriksson scored 5 goals and 5 assists in 26 matches for Sirius. His strength as a football player is his ability to hold the ball and his inside game.

References 
 "Andreas Eriksson till BP!", Black 'N Red, svenskafans.com, 21 November 2008
 "Andreas Eriksson tillbaka i BP", Sport, dn.se, 11 November 2008
 "BP gör klart med Sirius Eriksson", Fotbolls Express, fotbollsexpressen.se, 21 November 2008

External links 
 

1981 births
Swedish footballers
Living people
Association football midfielders
Association football forwards
AIK Fotboll players
IF Brommapojkarna players
AFC Eskilstuna players
IK Sirius Fotboll players